Nangolo Mbumba (born 15 August 1941) in Olukonda, Namibia. He is a Namibian politician who currently serves as the 2nd vice president of Namibia.

A member of the South West Africa People's Organization (SWAPO), Mbumba has headed a number of Namibian ministries: Agriculture, Water and Rural Development (1993–1996), Finance (1996–2003), Information and Broadcasting (2003–2005) Education (2005–2010), and Safety and Security (2010–2012). In 2012 he became the secretary-general of SWAPO serving until 2017.

Education and early career
Born on 15 August 1941 in Olukonda, Oshikoto Region, Mbumba graduated from Southern Connecticut State University in the United States with a BSc in 1971. In 1973, he graduated from the University of Connecticut with an MSc in biology.

After graduating from the University in Connecticut, Mbumba began teaching at Harlem Preparatory School in New York City. Leaving New York in 1978, he returned to Africa and began work as Head of the Science Department at the Namibia Education Centre in Cuanza Sul, Angola. In 1980, he was promoted to the post of Principal of the Centre, lasting in that position until 1985.

Politics
Mbumba officially took a position with SWAPO in 1985 as Deputy Secretary for Education and Culture. Leaving that position in 1987, Mbumba entered the position of Personal Secretary to SWAPO President Sam Nujoma. Continuing in inter-party positions, including as joint-administrator of Walvis Bay during its handover to Namibia in 1994, Mbumba gradually worked his way up the party. Since 1993, he has been a member of the National Assembly. Also beginning in 1993, Mbumba held a succession of ministries, including Agriculture, Water and Rural Development (1993-1996), Finance (1996-2003), Information and Broadcasting (2003-2005) Education (2005–2010), and Safety and Security (2010-2012).

Mbumba won the election for SWAPO Secretary-General at the 2012 SWAPO congress, a position that is considered #3 in the SWAPO party structure. He won with 352 votes against Utoni Nujoma 244 and pledged before the election that he would resign from his ministerial position if successful. On 4 December 2012, Immanuel Ngatjizeko was appointed to replace Mbumba as Minister of Safety and Security in the Cabinet reshuffle that followed the congress.

When Nickey Iyambo, Namibia's first vice president, was removed from the position on the ground of poor health, president Hage Geingob appointed Mbumba as successor. Mbumba is known for his sharp tongue.

References

Further sources
 Hopwood, Graham. Guide to Namibian Politics, 2007 edition. Namibia Institute for Democracy, Windhoek, 2007

External links
 Interview winne.com, 27 February 2006

1941 births
Living people
University of Connecticut alumni
Vice presidents of Namibia
Namibian educators
Members of the National Assembly (Namibia)
People from Oshikoto Region
SWAPO politicians
Agriculture ministers of Namibia
Education ministers of Namibia
Finance ministers of Namibia
Information ministers of Namibia
Security ministers of Namibia
Oshigambo High School alumni